The Queensland Head of the River refers to two high school rowing regattas in Queensland Australia, one for boys (Great Public Schools Association of Queensland Inc., GPS) and one for girls (Brisbane Schoolgirls' Rowing Association., BSRA). The boys' regatta is held in mid to late March while the girls' regatta is held in late August to early September. Due to the lack of water at Wivenhoe Dam the boys' Head of the River was moved to Hinze Dam for 2006, and was then moved to Lake Kawana on the Sunshine Coast, Queensland the following year. Since the girls require 10 lanes for their regattas, the BSRA Head of the River was held at Hinze Dam from 2005 to 2007. However, due to construction work currently underway to increase the size of the dam, the BSRA Head of the River was also moved to Lake Kawana for the 2008 season. Both the GPS and BSRA competitions moved to Wyralong Dam in 2017 following the opening of the Queensland State Regatta Center the previous year.

Queensland Schoolboys' Head of the River Regatta

Participating Schools
Seven of the nine GPS schools compete at the annual Head of the River. Only GPS Schools can compete.
Gregory Terrace first competed in 1928, but did not compete again until 1954.

Open 1st VIII – O'Connor Cup
The inaugural Schoolboys' Head of the River, known then as the All Schools Race, was held in 1918. The O'Connor Cup for the 1st VIII was first presented in 1922, and backdated to 1918. The race was by crews of Four from 1918 to 1954, and Eights since 1955.

The race is run over a 2000-metre course.
1983 - The race was run but due to multiple protests the race was deemed a "No Race" by the Headmasters at the time.
2005 - The race was shortened to 1800 metres due to lack of water in Wivenhoe Dam.

Points Score – Old Boys' Cup
The Old Boys' Cup for overall points score was first presented in 1988.In 1988 and 1989 the lowest number of points won. The point score system currently being used was introduced in 1990 and amended in 2001 when Nudgee College competed for the first time.  Only the 12 championship events count for points. 
The Championship events are: 
 Open 1st, 2nd, and 3rd Eights
 Year 11 1st, 2nd, and 3rd Eights
 Year 10 1st, 2nd, 3rd, 4th, 5th, and 6th Quad Sculls

In 2010, due to inclement weather, only the Open 1st, 2nd, and 3rd Eights were raced at Head of the River. Therefore, due to lack of events, the Old Boys' Cup was not awarded.

Winning Head of the River Championship Events

 The Eights race over 2000 metres and the Quads race over 1500 metres.
 Prior to 2003, the Under 15 age group raced in Fours.
 Since 2009, crews have raced by year group, rather than age group.

Head of the River Championship Events - Results

Queensland Schoolgirls' Head of the River Regatta

Participating Schools

Open 1st VIII – Brisbane Schoolgirls' Rowing Association Cup
1990 was the inaugural Schoolgirls' Head Of The River. The race was run over 1500 metres from 1990 until 1993, and over 2000 metres since 1994.

Points Score - Aggregate Cup
The Aggregate Cup for overall points score was first awarded in 1995 to the most successful school. Only the 21 Championship events count for points. 
The Championship events are: 

 In 2000, due to inclement weather, all Single Scull events were cancelled. Therefore, due to lack of events, the Aggregate Cup was not awarded.

Winning Head of the River Championship Events

Senior Age Groups

 The Senior Eights race over 2000 metres, the Senior Four races over 1500 metres, and the Single Sculls race over 1000 metres.
 Prior to 2002, the Senior age group was split into Year 11 and Open. The Year 11s raced in Fours and the Opens raced in both Fours and Eights.
 In 2009, the Open Single Scull, Open 2nd VIII, Open 3rd VIII, and Open IV were renamed to the Year 12 Single Scull, Senior 2nd VIII, Senior 3rd VIII, and Senior IV respectively.

Junior Age Groups

 The Year 10 Quads race over 1500 metres, and the Year 9 Quads, the Year 8 Quads, and the Single Sculls race over 1000 metres.

Head of the River Championship Events - Results

 Due to the number of participating schools outnumbering the number of lanes, each event is split into A and B Finals. Schools marked in italics participated in the B Final.

Open 2nd VIII

The Open Single Scull (Div 1)

See also
Head of the River (Australia)
Great Public Schools Association of Queensland
Queensland Girls' Secondary Schools Sports Association

References

 Great Public Schools Association of Queensland Inc., Head of the River Program (2007)
 Brisbane Schoolgirls' Rowing Association, Head of the River Program (2006)
 The Great Public Schools' Association of Qld Inc GPS HOR Rowing Results History - Winning 1st Crews - 10 March 2012
 The Great Public Schools' Association of Qld Inc HOR Old Boy's Cup History of Points Table Results - 16 March 2013
 Brisbane Schoolgirls' Rowing Association Overview
 Brisbane Schoolgirls' Rowing Association History
 Brisbane Schoolgirls' Rowing Association Aggregate Cup Historical Results

External links
The Great Public Schools' Association of Qld Inc
Rowing Australia
Rowing Queensland
Terrace Rowing
Brisbane Schoolgirls Rowing Association

Rowing competitions in Australia
Sport in Queensland
 
Recurring events established in 1918